Sphaerosciadium is a genus of flowering plants belonging to the family Apiaceae.

The species of this genus are found in Uzbekistan.

Species:
 Sphaerosciadium denaense (Schischk.) Pimenov & Kljuykov

References

Apioideae
Apioideae genera